Trifolium arvense, commonly known as the hare's-foot clover, rabbitfoot clover, stone clover or oldfield clover, is a flowering plant in the bean family Fabaceae. This species of clover is native to most of Europe, excluding the Arctic zone, and western Asia, in plain or mid-mountain habitats up to  altitude. It grows in dry sandy soils, both acidic and alkaline, soil with dry-mesic conditions and is typically found at the edge of fields, in wastelands, at the side of roads, on sand dunes, and opportunistically in vineyards and orchards when they are not irrigated.

Description
Trifolium arvense is a small erect herbaceous annual or biennial plant, growing to 10–40 cm tall. Like all clovers, its leaves are trifoliate, divided into three slender, sessile leaflets 1–2 cm long and 3–5 mm broad, sometimes edged with small hairs and finely serrated. The leaves have a pair of stipules at the base, often tipped in red. The flowers are grouped in a dense inflorescence 2–3 cm long and 1-1.5 cm broad; each flower is 4–5 mm long, rosy white in colour, and especially characterised by the many silky white hairs which tip the five sepals, which are much larger than the petals. These hairs, along with the more or less oblong form of the inflorescence, are the inspiration for the common name. Pollination is carried out by bees, or via autogamy, since the plant is hermaphroditic, and the flowering season is from mid-spring to late summer. The fruit is a small pod containing a single seed.

Distribution
Trifolium arvense is native to Europe and has been introduced to North America where it now appears throughout the eastern United States, southern Canada, and the western part of the U.S. along the Pacific Coast. The plant has also been recorded in some parts of Hawaii.

Reproduction
Trifolium arvense flowers in early summer and does not require a cold period to induce flowering. Larger plants in good condition may flower for a longer period. In wild populations of Trifolium arvense only plants that are large enough (dry weight >0.01g) tend to produce seeds. The flowers of Trifolium arvense are self-fertilized, but visits by bees provide some opportunity for cross-fertilization. The seeds produced by Trifolium arvense are covered by a hard seed coat which enables them to survive for a long period without germinating unless the seed coat is damaged.

Cultivation and uses
Like most legumes, it fixes nitrogen, making it valued on low fertility soils for the benefit it gives to other crop species in supplying nitrogen. It is also grazed by sheep and goats. The nitrogen fixing ability of Trifolium arvense depends on the size of nodule attach in the root system of legume. The sizes of nodule showing the positive correlation with the composition of community of microorganisms which are responsible for nitrogen fixing. In semi-arid area, the percentage of nitrogen originate from the atmosphere in total amount of nitrogen fixation done by Trifolium arvense has been maintained at a high level range which refers to 82%-91%. In raining season, the total quantity of nitrogen been fixed by Trifolium arvense is larger than the one in dry season.
The medicinal value of Trifolium arvense has been discovered to treat both humans and animals.

It has been introduced to North America, where it is an invasive species in some areas. Trifolium arvenseis also regarded as food by some animals like rabbit, wild turkey, deer etc. However, due to the hairy flowers of Trifolium arvense, if a horse or other livestock were fed with too much of them, abdominal obstruction may be caused leading to death. In addition, Trifolium arvense is also a kind of plant that has the characteristic of allergenicity. Although it is mild as allergen, it needs to be paid attention to.

Scientists at AgResearch in New Zealand have used genetic modification to take a single gene from Trifolium arvense and put it into the more common white clover, Trifolium repens. The genetically modified clover could reduce bloating in livestock and decrease methane emissions. The release of the genetically modified clover is expected to be in approximately 2025.

Management
Being part of Fabaceae, Trifolium arvense is managed similarly to other weeds in the family. Trifolium arvense can be easily controlled in small scale field like home garden by hand-pulling, cultivation or using mulch. But when it comes to farm or landscape of wide field, due to the seeds of Trifolium arvense are highly tolerant of extreme temperature as well as physical damage because of their tiny size, long-term efforts of fighting against Trifolium arvense is required. Tillage and composting would not work well in this situation compared to other kinds of weeds. Chemical application is needed to assist to remove Trifolium arvense. Once the weedy situation is under control, changing the cultural practice and turfgrass is necessary to avoid them to emerge again. In addition, increasing the amount of nitrogen and decreasing the amount of phosphorus contained in fertilizer used can be effective in removing family Fabaceae weeds and other weeds as well.

References

External links

 Flore des Hautes-Alpes 
 HYPPA 
 Quattrofolium

Flora of Europe
Flora of Estonia
Flora of Lebanon
Flora of the United Kingdom
arvense
Plants described in 1753
Taxa named by Carl Linnaeus